KAPS (Korean Active Protection System) is an active protection system developed by the Agency for Defense Development and Hanwha Thales (now Hanwha Systems) for K2 Black Panther in 2011. In order to strengthen the viability of main battle tank in South Korea, it was decided to introduce a hard-kill active protection system that will be applied to K2 Black Panther tanks and completed the development under the leadership of Agency for Defense Development (ADD) from 2006 to December 2011.

Description
The KAPS (Korean Active Protection System) is a hard-kill active protection system that instantly destroys an enemy’s incoming anti-tank guided missile (ATGM) or rocket projectile targeted at a tank by counter-firing at it using its detection and tracking data, and can significantly improve the survivability of main battle tank. Unlike active protection system of guided disturbance (Soft-kill), It is composed of 2 search and tracking radars, 2 IR trackers, 1 fire control computer, 2 grenade launchers and 4 responsive grenade.
 
Based on the location, distance, and speed information of the approaching rocket or missile, FMCW radar and laceration trackers calculate detection and tracking information, and based on this, the fire control computer controls threat judgment and countermeasure to issue a countermeasure command with a grenade launcher. The FMCW radar detects rockets and AGTM flying 100 to 150 meters from the tank, and when the projectile approaches 10 to 15 meters near the tank, it fires 70 mm of grenade from the grenade launcher to neutralize the projectile.

The initial design of KAPS considered the development of a method consisting of a ring-shaped grenade launcher and a long cylindrical shaped grenade launcher that can fire two 70 mm grenades. Since then, to protect the grenade and reduce the weight of the grenade launcher, the design has been changed to an open type launcher with a grenade connected to the ignition plug in a cylindrical tube fixed to the ring.

The grenade launcher is designed to move in a two-axis manner and can fire grenades within the range of 60 degrees above and below. 2 grenade launchers capable of firing 70 mm grenades aim in the same direction to prepare for the threat of successive rockets to the tank or the attack of AGTM.

Installation test 
ADD and DAPA conducted the test of KAPS in February 2012. In this test, the KAPS successfully intercepted RPG-7 and Metis-M rockets approaching 10 to 15 meters in front of the tank in 0.2 to 0.3 seconds.

Status 
KAPS was developed for the K2 Black Panther, but it was not installed on the K2 due to high production costs, concerns about damage to infantry, and problems that Multispectral Screening Smoke Grenade (MSSG) soft-kill and hard-kill active protection systems could not be used at the same time. The K2 tank currently being mass-produced is equipped with only a VIRSS soft-kill active protection systems, and in the future, KAPS will be installed in the K2 PIP (K2 Product Improvement Program), an improved model of the K2.

References

External links 
 Youtube video clip of the K-2 tank's Active Protection System test.

Armoured fighting vehicle equipment
Weapons countermeasures
Land active protection systems